Louis Schanker (1903 – May 7, 1981) was an American abstract artist.

Early life 
He grew up in an Orthodox Jewish environment in the Bronx, New York. His parents, Sam, a tailor, and Fannie Schanker, were of Romanian descent. He had five siblings. At an early age he had an interest in both art and music. He took art courses at Cooper Union, The Educational Alliance and The Art Students League with Barnett Newman, Mark Rothko and Milton Avery amongst others. During this time he shared a coldwater studio with the Soyer brothers, Chaim Gross and Adolph Gottlieb. In 1920, he traveled across the country. He lived the hobo life, joined the Sparks and then Barnum and Bailey circuses, later working as a thresher in the wheat fields of the Great Plains. There are elements in his works such as the circus murals done for the Neponsit Beach Children's Hospital and the print "Man Cutting Wheat" that reflect these experiences. Around 1924 he returned to New York, leased another studio and resumed his friendships and artwork. Schanker spent 1931 and 1932 attending classes at the Académie de la Grande Chaumière, painting and traveling in Paris, Italy and Spain and returned as something of a Cubist. He had his first show in 1933 at the Contemporary Arts Gallery and first exhibited at the Whitney Museum in 1936.

Career 
The Federal Government sponsored programs to assist people during the 1930s depression when there were no jobs available. Artists were included in the Public Works of Art Project and then the WPA Federal Art Project. Schanker participated in both beginning in 1933.  He was an artist and supervisor in the mural and graphic arts departments. In the New York City Division he worked with many other artists including Jackson Pollock, Lee Krasner, Burgoyne Diller, Byron Browne, Milton Avery, and Stuart Davis. These were controversial times in the arts community. In 1935 he and others (Ilya Bolotowsky, Ben-Zion, Marcus Rothkowitz (aka, Mark Rothko), Adolph Gottlieb, Joseph Solman, Tschacbasov, Louis Harris, and Ralph Rosenborg) formed a group called The Ten 
that protested the lack of support for American Abstract Artists by the Whitney Museum which concentrated on representational art. Schanker and Bolotowsky were also in the awkward position of having their works being shown in the museum's 1936 Annual exhibit at the same time that they were protesting. Another group, founded in 1936, of which he was a founding member, the American Abstract Artists, (AAA) arose to promote and foster public understanding of abstract art.

Schanker was a radical among radicals. His "conglomerations of color-patches, among other things", wrote the sympathetic art critic Emily Genauer in 1935, "are bound to alienate no small part of the gallery-going public." However, the work proved popular in the New York art scene.

By 1937, even the often hostile New York Times art critic Edward Alden Jewell softened to the artist. When speaking of Schanker's major WPA mural at the municipal building studios of WNYC in New York, Jewell noted that Schanker had "a touch of lyric feeling".  In 1938, Art News declared that "Louis Schanker's delightful Street Scene From My Window calls forth admiration for its delicacy of color and kaleidoscopic forms in plane geometry."

A decade later Schanker wrote:

Though much of my work is generally classified as abstract, all of my work develops from natural forms. I have great respect for the forms of nature and an inherent need to express myself in relation to those forms.

Schanker moved into teaching, first at the New School for Social Research and then, from 1949 until his retirement, at Bard College. The January 1955 Life Magazine article "Comeback of an Art", describes him as "one of the earliest U.S.woodcut artists to do abstractions, Schanker since has trained or influenced a generation of talented younger artists."

He was one of the major printmakers of the 1930s. He continued to be an active part of the New York art scene with many group and solo exhibitions including two shows (1943 and 1974,) at the Brooklyn Museum and a 1978 retrospective at the Associated American Artists. Just a few blocks from the hospital where he died in 1981 the Martin Diamond Gallery was holding a major show of his oils, sculpture and prints and his work was on exhibit at the Whitney Museum of American Art.

By all accounts a delightful man, Schanker was suspect to some because of his joie de vivre.  According to Mercury Gallery owner, Sidney Schectman, who was showing the works of the Ten from 1937–39, Rothko was by all reports a very serious person.  He did not have many friends. "I know he liked Schanker. I once talked to him about him, but he told me that Schanker was a playboy of some sort even then, but a great painter and a great wood block [painter] ... you know, painted, the greatest. "But I don't know where he's going to go," he would say because he thought he was frivolous. And that's the kind of person Rothko was, terribly, terribly serious."

Schanker's has remained popular and there is still continuing interest in his works. In 1989, summing up Schanker's career for a book on American abstraction, Virginia Mecklenburg wrote of "an animated expressionism that aims at a fundamental emotional structure".

Personal life 
In December 1960, Schanker married socialite Libby Holman. It was his second marriage. They remained together until her death in 1971.

Death 
Schanker died on May 7, 1981 at the Lenox Hill Hospital, after previously suffering a stroke. He was 78 years old.

References

Public collections
 The Art Institute of Chicago, Chicago, Illinois
The Boston Public Library, Boston, Massachusetts
The Brooklyn Museum of Art, Brooklyn, New York
Carnegie Museums of Pittsburgh/Carnegie Institute, Pittsburgh, Pennsylvania
Cincinnati Art Museum, Cincinnati, Ohio
The Cleveland Museum of Art, Cleveland, Ohio
CU Art Museum, University of Colorado at Boulder
The Detroit Institute of Arts, Detroit, Michigan
The Metropolitan Museum of Art, New York, New York
University of Michigan Museum of Art, Ann Arbor, Michigan
Museum of Modern Art, New York, New York
Neuberger Museum of Art, SUNY, Purchase College, Purchase, New York
The Newark Museum, Newark, New Jersey
New York Public Library, New York, New York
Philadelphia Museum of Art, Philadelphia, Pennsylvania
The Phillips Collection, Washington, D.C.
Sheldon Memorial Art Gallery, Lincoln, Nebraska

Further reading
 Louis Schanker, "The Ides of Art: Eleven Graphic Artists Write", Tiger's Eye 8 (June 1949) p. 45.
Acton, D., Adams, C., & Beall, K. F. (1990). A spectrum of innovation color in American printmaking, 1890-1960. New York: Norton.
Diamond, M. (1995). Who were they? my personal contact with thirty-five American modernists your art history course never mentioned. New Rochelle, N.Y.: M. Diamond.
McCoy, G. (1972). Louis Schanker (1903-). Archives of American Art. 123.
 Virginia M Mecklenburg; Patricia Frost; Phillip Frost; National Museum of American Art (U.S.), The Patricia and Phillip Frost collection, American abstraction, 1930-1945(Washington, D.C. : Published for the National Museum of American Art by the Smithsonian Institution Press, ©1989.) , 
 Marika Herskovic, New York School Abstract Expressionists Artists Choice by Artists, (New York School Press, 2000.) . p. 16; p. 38; p. 330-333
 Schanker, L., & Johnson, U. E. (1974). Louis Schanker prints, 1924-1971. American graphic artists of the twentieth century, monograph no. 9. Brooklyn: Brooklyn Museum.
Steiner, R. J. (1999). The Art Students League of New York a history. Saugerties, New York: CSS Publications.
United States. (1987). A New deal for American art in federal buildings, "Aerial act" Work Projects Administration, 1935-1943 golden anniversary. Washington, D.C.: U.S. General Services Administration.

External links
 Louis Schanker, 1903 -1981  Printmaker, Painter, Sculptor: 60 years of experimentation
 The Ten
 American Abstract Artists
 Smithsonian Institution Research Information System; Archival, Manuscript and Photographic Collections, Louis Schanker
 Smithsonian Institution Research Information System; Louis Schanker artwork in the collection

1903 births
1981 deaths
20th-century American painters
American male painters
Abstract expressionist artists
Art Students League of New York alumni
American people of Romanian-Jewish descent
Alumni of the Académie de la Grande Chaumière
20th-century American sculptors
20th-century American male artists
American male sculptors
Federal Art Project artists
Public Works of Art Project artists
20th-century American printmakers
Sculptors from New York (state)
Sports artists